Ypsilopus is a genus of flowering plants from the orchid family, Orchidaceae native to Africa.

Species 
Ypsilopus erectus (P.J.Cribb) P.J.Cribb & J.Stewart - Tanzania, Mozambique, Malawi, Zambia, Zimbabwe, South Africa 
Ypsilopus leedalii P.J.Cribb - Tanzania
Ypsilopus liae Delep. & J.-P.Lebel - Rwanda
Ypsilopus longifolius (Kraenzl.) Summerh. - Tanzania, Kenya
Ypsilopus viridiflorus P.J.Cribb & J.Stewart - Tanzania

See also 
 List of Orchidaceae genera

References 

Vandeae genera
Orchids of Africa
Angraecinae